Karabash Reservoir is a reservoir of the upper Zay River near Karabash, Tatarstan, Russian Federation. It was filled in 1957 for the local oil and other industry needs. It has surface area 7.31 km², a length 8.7 km, mean depth 7.2 m  and a volume 52.3 million cubic meters.

Reservoirs in Russia
Reservoirs in Tatarstan